Q56 may refer to:
 Q56 (New York City bus)
 Al-Waqi'a, a surah of the Quran